Holocentrus is a genus of squirrelfishes found in the Atlantic Ocean.

Species
There are currently two recognized species in this genus:
 Holocentrus adscensionis (Osbeck, 1765) (Squirrelfish)
 Holocentrus rufus (Walbaum, 1792) (Longspine squirrelfish)

References

Holocentridae
Ray-finned fish genera
Taxa named by Giovanni Antonio Scopoli